2020–21 Syed Mushtaq Ali Trophy was the thirteenth edition of Syed Mushtaq Ali Trophy, a Twenty20 competition that was played in India. It started on 10 January 2021, with the final taking place on 31 January 2021. Karnataka were the defending champions.

On 17 December 2020, the Board of Control for Cricket in India (BCCI) confirmed the fixtures, with 38 teams split into six groups. Groups A to E had six teams, while the Plate Group had eight teams. The winners from each group progressed to the quarter-finals, along the next two teams in Groups A to E with the most points.

Punjab and Baroda won Groups A and C respectively to qualify for the knockout stage of the tournament. Tamil Nadu won Group B to also progress to the knockout stage. The Plate Group was won by Bihar, making them the only team from that group to progress. On the final day of the group stage matches, Rajasthan won Group D, and Haryana won Group E to advance. Karnataka and Himachal Pradesh took the remaining two places in the quarter-finals, finishing the group stage as the best two second placed teams.

The first two quarter-finals saw Punjab beat Karnataka by nine wickets, and Tamil Nadu beat Himachal Pradesh by five wickets. In the third quarter-final, Baroda beat Haryana by eight wickets. In the last quarter-final match, Rajasthan became the fourth team to progress to the semi-finals, with a 16-run win over Bihar.

In the first semi-final, Tamil Nadu beat Rajasthan by seven wickets to advance to their second successive final in the Syed Mushtaq Ali Trophy. They were joined in the final by Baroda, after they beat Punjab by 25 runs in the second semi-final. In the final, Tamil Nadu beat Baroda by seven wickets to win the tournament.

Player transfers
The following player transfers were approved ahead of the season.

Background
The tournament was originally scheduled to run from 19 November to 7 December 2020. However, in September 2020, the Board of Control for Cricket in India (BCCI) warned that the domestic cricket season could be severely curtailed due to the COVID-19 pandemic, including the possibility of no cricket taking place. On 20 September 2020, Nadim Memon of the Mumbai Cricket Association emailed the BCCI to suggest that the tournament could be played Mumbai. The city has six cricket stadiums, complete with all the relevant facilities and hotels nearby. On 13 December 2020, the BCCI confirmed the fixtures and venues for the tournament, with each group playing their matches in bio-secure bubbles.

League stage

Group A

Group B

Group C

Group D

Group E

Plate Group

Knockout stage

Quarter-finals

Semi-finals

Final

References

External links
 Series home at ESPN Cricinfo

2020 in Indian cricket
Domestic cricket competitions in 2020–21